The Chatty Cafe Scheme was started in 2017 as initiative to encourage conversation among strangers. The initiative promotes the marking of certain tables in cafes and other venues as tables at which talking to strangers is explicitly welcome. The initiative found support by several companies and politicians in the UK. The Chatty Cafe Scheme CIC was registered as a community interest company on 19 July 2019; Chatty Cafe was registered as a charity in Australia in 2020. The founder of the initiative and director of the company, Alexandra Louise Hoskyn, was awarded an OBE in the Queen’s Birthday Honours for 2021.

United Kingdom

Implementation in the United Kingdom 
The first Chatter & Natter table was set up in a cafe in Oldham, England, in 2017. The founder of the initiative and later director of the company, Alexandra Louise Hoskyn, is a social worker in the Learning Disability and Autism team in Oldham. The Chatty Cafe scheme soon found support by Costa Coffee and Sainsbury’s, referring to the tables with varying terms, for example "talking tables", and was implemented in cafes across the country as well as in the United States. As of 2018, there were over 500 cafes participating in the UK.

The Oldham Borough Council discussed the scheme, noted that "libraries, leisure centres, and the local markets; health centres and hospitals run by the NHS; and pubs, cafes, shopping centres and retail parks run by business partners have potential to host such schemes", and resolved to ask the Chief Executive to offer, to the Chatty Cafe Scheme, the council’s support once the Coronavirus measures would be lifted. Further organisations supporting the scheme include Beefeater, Age UK, Mind, Campaign to End Loneliness, and Whitebread. Andy Street, mayor of the West Midlands county, has campaigned for coffee shops and other venues to participate in the scheme. MP David Lammy has named the scheme in his book Tribes, published 2020, and has referred to it as an original local initiative in terms of his proposed ‘encounter culture’ for encouraging "meaningful engagement between people of different ages, ethnicities, backgrounds and places on an equal basis".

To overcome persons' hesitation to be the first at a table, the initiative created the role of an "ambassador" as a person to be present at a table a few hours a week. Additionally, the role of a "volunteer" was created, who visits various venues seeking feedback as to how the tables are going.

During the COVID-19 pandemic in the United Kingdom, the scheme was extended to include telephone and video calls to combat isolation, matching volunteers with persons wanting a call on a weekly basis. According to the organisers, local social services have in some cases referred persons to the Chatty Cafe initiative.

In September 2020, the Chatty Cafe Scheme joined the British government’s Tackling Loneliness Network, a group of charities that was formed in spring 2020 as part of the government’s plan to tackle loneliness and social isolation during the COVID-19 outbreak and period of social distancing.

Critical views 
Bethan Harris, founder of the research project Loneliness Lab, has been quoted as saying that initiatives such as the Chatty Cafe scheme are praiseworthy, yet may offer too simplistic solutions in as far as overcoming loneliness is concerned, given that people may be searching for meaningful interaction and the opportunity to build relations, not mere chance interaction.

Similar initiatives 
In 2019, the BBC reported on "Happy to Chat" benches and on an initiative by the BBC and public transport companies encouraging people to talk to their fellow passengers.

Implementation abroad 
In December 2019, Hoskyn presented the scheme in a TEDxKazimierzWomen event in Kraków, Małopolskie, Poland, and at the end of 2020, Chatter and Natter tables had been set up in Poland, Gibraltar, Australia and Canada. Chatty Cafe was registered as a charity in Australia in 2020. Given that the British expression "natter" is not used in Australia, the tables are referred to as "Have a Chat" tables.

Impact 
The scheme started in Britain, where "traditional reserve is said to make it almost impossible for the British to talk to strangers in public places". The scheme has been cited as one of several examples of social, affective spaces and has cited in a book on ageing society as contributing to creating communities. In a report about the role of pubs in British communities, sociologist Thomas Thurnell-Read has credited the initiative as being inspirational to further initiatives such as the use of ‘Join Me’ cards in a pub in the Southeast of England. Such cards enable customers to let other customers and staff know they are open to having a conversation.

Awards 
 2018: Royal Society grant
 2019: Innovating for Ageing competition by the Just group and International Longevity Centre
 2020: Points of Light award by British prime minister Boris Johnson for "transforming the culture of talking to other people in cafes, combating loneliness and opening up people’s lives" with the scheme.
2021: OBE for Hoskyn in the Queen’s Birthday Honours for 2021

References

External links 
 thechattycafescheme.co.uk

Civil society in the United Kingdom
Coffee culture
Community interest companies
British companies established in 2019